Martti Kiilholma (born 3 June 1950) is a Finnish former long-distance runner who held national records in the 5,000 metres, 10,000 metres, and 20,000 metres. He won the inaugural California International Marathon in 1983.

Achievements

References 

1950 births
Living people
Finnish male long-distance runners
Finnish male marathon runners